Caesarea-Pardes Hanna railway station (Taḥanat HaRakevet Keisariya-Pardes Ḥana) is an Israel Railways passenger station between the local council Pardes Hanna-Karkur and Caesarea's industrial zone, and serves these towns, their large industrial zones, as well as Or Akiva and other small communities in the area.

Location 
The station is situated on the north–south coastal line and is located to the northwest of Pardes Hanna-Karkur, at the eastern edge of The Northern Caesarea Industries Park.

History 
Caesarea-Pardes Hanna station was opened on 1 July 2001 as a suburban station on the newly inaugurated Tel Aviv – Binyamina Suburban Service. The station was constructed to provide a railway link for the area's growing population as well as encourage rail commuting to the industrial zone in the vicinity.

The cost of constructing the station was 7 million NIS (about 1.7 million USD), and was partially funded by the Caesarea Development Corporation.

Design 
The station consists of two side platforms with two parallel rail tracks running between them. The station hall is located on the west platform on the grounds of the industrial park. A pedestrian tunnel connects the two platforms beneath the tracks as well as providing access to the station from the eastern (Pardes Hanna) side of the rail tracks.

The station is unique with its teal coloring, and the designs of the shelters on the platforms.

Train service 

Caesarea-Pardes Hanna station is a station on the Tel Aviv suburban line (Binyamina/Netanya–Tel Aviv–Rehovot–Ashkelon–Netivot–Beersheba Suburban Service). Almost all Inter-City trains pass through this station without stopping, except on the weekends. The station is situated between Binyamina Railway Station to the north and Hadera Ma'arav (West) Railway Station to the south.

Timetable highlights:

Suburban service:
On weekdays the station is served by 21 southbound and 23 northbound suburban trains. First train departs at 06:20 and last train arrives at 21:45.
On Fridays and holiday eves the station is served by 5 southbound and 6 northbound suburban trains. First train departs at 10:52 and last train arrives at 14:55.
Inter-City service:
On weekdays the station is served only by 5 northbound trains – an early morning train at 06:19 and 4 late night trains from 21:29 until 00:23
On Fridays and holiday eves the station is served by 13 southbound and 9 northbound trains. First train departs at 06:16 and last train arrives at 14:39.
On Motzei Shabbat and holiday the station is served by 6 southbound and 5 northbound trains. First train departs at 19:20 and last train arrives at 21:46.

Station layout
Platform numbers increase in an East-to-West direction

Ridership

Public transport connections 
Caesarea-Pardes Hanna station is located inside an industrial area but several bus lines pass outside the station. The bus lines are:
4: Pardes Hanna-Karkur–Caesarea-Pardes Hanna, operated by Egged.
10: Or Aqiva–Orot, operated by Kavim.
11: Or Aqiva–Orot, operated by Kavim.
28: Pardes Hanna-Karkur–Caesarea-Pardes Hanna, operated by Egged.
67: Hadera–Caesarea-Pardes Hanna, operated by Kavim.
80: Caesarea–Caesarea-Pardes Hanna, operated by Kavim.

Facilities 
Payphone
Ticket cashier
Parking lot
Toilet

References

External links 
Israel Railways website
Caesarea Development Corporation

Railway stations in Haifa District
Railway station
Railway station
Railway stations opened in 2001
2001 establishments in Israel